Marco Bortolotti (born 21 January 1991) is an Italian tennis player.

Bortolotti has a career high doubles ranking of 103 achieved on 22 August 2022. He also has a career high ATP singles ranking of 355 achieved on 25 April 2016.

Bortolotti has won 5 ATP Challenger doubles titles, the first at the 2021 Open Città della Disfida.

Tour titles

Doubles

References

External links
 
 

1991 births
Living people
Italian male tennis players
People from Guastalla
Sportspeople from the Province of Reggio Emilia
21st-century Italian people